Anthony Schmalz Conrad (March 7, 1940 – April 9, 2016)  was an American video artist, experimental filmmaker, musician, composer, sound artist, teacher, and writer. Active in a variety of media since the early 1960s, he was a pioneer of both drone music and structural film. As a musician, he was an important figure in the New York minimalist scene of the early 1960s, during which time he performed as part of the Theatre of Eternal Music (along with John Cale, La Monte Young, Marian Zazeela, and others). He became recognized as a filmmaker for his 1966 film The Flicker. He performed and collaborated with a wide range of artists over the course of his career.

Biography

Early life
Conrad was born in Concord, New Hampshire to Mary Elizabeth Parfitt and Arthur Emil Conrad but raised in Baldwin, Maryland and Northern Virginia. His father worked with Everett Warner during World War II in designing dazzle camouflage for the US Navy. Conrad's high school violin lessons with symphony violist Ronald Knudsen introduced him to just intonation and double stop playing. Conrad graduated from Harvard University in 1962 with a degree in Mathematics. While studying at Harvard, Conrad was exposed to the ideas of John Cage and Karlheinz Stockhausen. After graduating, Conrad went to Copenhagen to see a friend, who was a research mathematician working on a computer project at the Physics Chemist Institute. That computer had a memory of 8 kilobytes. Conrad worked on it in machine language during the summer, which helped build his computer skills. He also did work as a computer programmer for a year when he came back to the United States.

After working as a computer programmer, Conrad got into the experimental music scene in New York City.

1960s

After moving to New York, Conrad became an early member of the Theatre of Eternal Music (nicknamed The Dream Syndicate) which included the leader La Monte Young, John Cale, Angus MacLise, and Marian Zazeela. Theatre of Eternal Music utilized just intonation and sustained sound (drones) to produce what the group called dream music (and is now called drone music). 

In 1963, he joined his former Harvard classmate Henry Flynt in his anti-art demonstrations against "elitist" New York cultural institutions.

Conrad and John Cale were recruited by Pickwick Records to play as a backing band for a new act, The Primitives, to perform the 1964 single "The Ostrich"/"Sneaky Pete". Conrad and Cale played guitar and bass, the artist Walter de Maria joined on drums, and the only pre-existing member of the band, Lou Reed, sang. Conrad and Cale's instruments were tuned to "Ostrich tuning" – every string to the same pitch. This made them easier to play, and also resonated with the drone music they were playing with the Theatre of Eternal Music. After a few shows, the group disbanded. Cale and Reed went on to form The Velvet Underground. Conrad was indirectly responsible for the name of The Velvet Underground, although he was never a member of the group. After moving into Conrad's old apartment on Ludlow Street in New York City, Reed and Cale found a book titled The Velvet Underground, which had belonged to Conrad, and took the book's name for their group.

1970s 
Conrad's first musical release, and only release for many years, was a 1972 collaboration with the German "Krautrock" group Faust, Outside the Dream Syndicate, published by Caroline (UK) in 1973. This remains his best known musical work and is considered a classic of minimalist music and drone music.

One of Conrad's early films was Coming Attractions, which was released in 1970. This film led indirectly to the founding of Syntonic Research and the Environments series of natural sound recordings.

Yellow Movies was a project of Conrad's in 1973 of twenty "movies" consisting of rectangular borders painted in black house paint on large pieces of photographic paper, effectively framing each sizable expanse of emulsion. Conrad's concept came from a continued attempt at pushing the framework of film, and his interest in engaging the audience in long spaces of time. He wanted to make a film that would last fifty years, but knew that "normal materials" and projection could not last that long. So he created an entirely new conceptual stratagem for Yellow Movies whereby the physical aging and transformation of the emulsion itself would constitute a definitively slow-motion moving picture over such an extended period of time.

Conrad began to work in video and performance in the 1970s as a professor at Antioch College in Ohio, where he replaced the filmmaker Paul Sharits. In 1976, Conrad joined the faculty at the Center for Media studies at the University at Buffalo. While in Buffalo, Conrad was part of a scene that included Sharits, as well as Hollis Frampton, Steina and Woody Vasulka, Peter Weibel, James Blue, Cathy Steffan and Gerald O'Grady. Their practices in film, video, performance, and other forms were documented in the 2008 book Buffalo Heads: Media Study, Media Practice, Media Pioneers, 1973–1990, edited by Vasulka and Weibel.

In the mid-1970s, Conrad began performing film. With Sukiyaki Film he decided that the film should be prepared immediately before viewing. Sukiyaki was chosen as the paradigm for the work because it is a dish often cooked immediately before eating, in front of the diners. Conrad cooked sukiyaki in front of an audience: egg, meat, vegetables, and 16mm film; and literally "projected" onto the screen behind him.

Conrad made a piece called Pickled Film.

Later life
Later, Conrad composed more than a dozen audio works with special scales and tuning for solo amplified violin with amplified strings. Releases included Early Minimalism Volume 1, a four-CD set, Slapping Pythagoras in 1995, Four Violins (1964) in 1996, Outside the Dream Syndicate Alive with Faust, from London 1995, and Fantastic Glissando. He also issued two archival CDs featuring the work of late New York filmmaker Jack Smith, with whom he was associated in the 1960s. He released the 1968 recording of Joan of Arc in 2006.

Conrad collaborated with artists such as Charlemagne Palestine, Genesis Breyer P-Orridge, Keiji Haino, Jim O'Rourke, David Grubbs, C Spencer Yeh, Tovah Olson, MV Carbon, and numerous others. Conrad was chosen by Animal Collective to perform at the All Tomorrow's Parties festival that they curated in May 2011.  In 2012 Conrad was part of the line-up of the touring avant garde festival Sonic Protest that took place in five cities in France. In 2013 Conrad visited Genoa to open his first solo exhibition in Italy.

Conrad's work has been shown at many museums including the Museum of Modern Art, P.S. 1, and the Whitney Museum of American Art in New York City; the Walker Art Center in Minneapolis; the Louvre in Paris; the Museum of Contemporary Art in Los Angeles; and many others. Specifically, his film The Flicker was included in the Whitney Museum of American Art's exhibition, The American Century; he participated in the 2006 Whitney Biennial; and one of his Yellow Paintings was featured in the museum's 2015–2016 exhibition "Collected by Thea Westreich Wagner and Ethan Wagner."

Conrad's artwork is represented by Greene Naftali Gallery in New York City, and by Galerie Buchholz in Germany.

Conrad had been a faculty member in the State University of New York at Buffalo since 1976. He continued to teach there in the Department of Media Study.

Death
Conrad died in Cheektowaga, New York on April 9, 2016, at age 76 after fighting prostate cancer.

Partial discography
 Outside the Dream Syndicate (with Faust) (Caroline, 1973)
 Slapping Pythagoras (Table of the Elements, 1995)
 The Japanese Room at La Pagode / May (split with Gastr del Sol) (Table of the Elements, 1995)
 Four Violins (1964) (Table of the Elements, 1996)
 Early Minimalism Volume One (Table of the Elements, 1997)
 Inside the Dream Syndicate Volume I: Day of Niagara (with John Cale, Angus MacLise, La Monte Young, and Marian Zazeela) (Table of the Elements, [Recorded 1965] 2000)
 Fantastic Glissando (Table of the Elements, 2003)
 Joan of Arc (Table of the Elements, [Recorded 1968] 2006)
 An Aural Symbiotic Mystery (with Charlemagne Palestine) (Sub Rosa, 2006)
 Taking Issue (with Genesis Breyer P-Orridge) (Dais Records, 2009)
 XXX Macarena (with Jutta Koether and John Miller) (From the Nursery and Primary Information, 2010)
 Ten Years Alive on the Infinite Plain (Superior Viaduct, 2017)

References

External links

 Tony Conrad at Galerie Buchholz
 Tony Conrad Website
 Interview with Tony Conrad, 1996
 "About Tony Conrad" from the Center for Art and Media (ZKM) in Karlsruhe, Germany
 
 Tony Conrad in the Video Data Bank
 {https://film-makerscoop.com/filmmakers/tony-conrad/bio Tony Conrad] at The Film-Makers' Cooperative
 Tony Conrad's MySpace Page
 Tony Conrad faculty page at University at Buffalo
 Yellow Movies via moma.org

Video
 PUNKCAST#1143-02 Live @ Swiss Institute NYC on May 2, 2007. (Flash)

1940 births
2016 deaths
American experimental filmmakers
Artists from Baltimore
Harvard College alumni
American noise musicians
People from Concord, New Hampshire
University at Buffalo faculty
American video artists
The Velvet Underground
American avant-garde musicians
American experimental musicians
Deaths from prostate cancer
Deaths from cancer in New York (state)
Dais Records artists